The Not happy, John!' campaign was an Australian political campaign to oppose the re-election of Prime Minister John Howard as member for Bennelong in the 2004 Australian federal election. The title of the campaign is based on the popular television commercial "Not happy, Jan!" and the book Not Happy, John by Margo Kingston.

The campaign did not promote any specific candidate; instead, it called for votes for any other candidate standing against Howard. The campaign was unsuccessful, in that Howard was returned as member, but had some success in that it reduced Howard's majority by 3% in the face of a 2% swing to Howard's Liberal Party, and he did lose the seat as sitting Prime Minister in the subsequent election.

Supporters of the campaign included Margo Kingston (journalist), John Valder (previous president of Howard's Liberal party), Brian Deegan (former magistrate, who stood against Alexander Downer), Andrew Wilkie (Greens candidate), Alex Broun playwright and Nicole Campbell (Australian Labor Party candidate). The campaign was launched on 22 June 2004 and continued until the election on 9 October.

There was a small Not Happy, John Campaign for the 2007 election based on the philosophy behind the original campaign.

References

Further reading 
 Kingston, Margo. Not Happy, John! defending Australia's democracy. Paperback, 240 pages. Published June 2004 by Penguin. .

External links 
 Not Happy John Campaign site

2004 elections in Australia